Kongolo Bridge is a cantilever rail and road bridge that crosses the Lualaba River. It was constructed by the Belgians in 1939, and was reconstructed in 1968 under the Mobutu regime by the German engineer Erich F. Weigl. It is located near the town of Kongolo.

The width of the Lualaba river is about 440 m, while the main span of the bridge is 70 meters, and has a single 5-meter-wide lane for all traffic, including dual-gauge rails.

See also 

 List of road-rail bridges

External links 
 Structurae profile

Lualaba River
Bridges in the Democratic Republic of the Congo
Road-rail bridges
Bridges over the Congo River